Jan Jakuš (born 18 February 1954) is a Slovak medical researcher, author and professor of Pathophysiology.

Career
He studied medicine at, and is currently serving as a professor of biophysics at the Jessenius School of Medicine in Martin which is a part of the Comenius University in Bratislava. He has also served as the head of the department of Biophysics since 2007.

Selected publications
 Jakuš J., Tomori Z., Stránsky A.: Activity of bulbar respiratory neurones during cough and other respiratory tract reflexes in cats. Physiol. bohemoslov. 34(2), 1985, 127–136.
 Jakuš J., Tomori Z., Stránsky A.: Bulbar respiratory activity during defensive airways reflexes in cats. Acta Physiol. Hung. 70(2–3), 1987, 245–254.
 Yates B.J., Jakuš J., Miller A.D.: Vestibular effects on respiratory outflow in the decerebrate cat. Brain Res. 629, 1993, 209–217.
 Jakuš J., Stránsky A., Poliaèek I., Baráni H., Bošelová ¼.: Kainic acid lesion to the Lateral tegmental field of medulla. Effects on Cough, Expiration and Aspiration reflexes in anesthetized cats. Physiol. Res., 49(3), 2000, 387–398.
 Jakuš J., Tomori Z.: Neuronal Determinants of Breathing, Coughing and Related Motor Behaviors. Martin, Wist, 2004, 335p. 
 Jakuš J.: Central control of the cough reflex. pp. 117–171. In: Korpáš J., Paintal S., Anand A., eds. Péèová R., Tatár M., Fraòová S., Hanáèek J., Javorka K., Jakuš J., Mokrý J., Nosá¾ová G., Plutinský J., Sadloòová J., Šutovská M.: Cough: from lab to clinic. 2006; New Delhi: Ane Books India, 348s.

Bibliography
  2004: Ján Jakuš, Zoltán Tomori, Albert Stránsky. : Neuronal determinants of breathing, coughing and related motor behaviours: Basics of nervous control and reflex mechanisms

References

External links
 Personal website 
 Department of Pathology at Jessenius School of Medicine

Living people
Comenius University alumni
Charles University alumni
Academic staff of Comenius University
Slovak pathologists
1954 births
People from the Trenčín Region
People from Trenčín District